Kellyn LaCour-Conant is a Creole restoration ecologist. Kellyn is a director of Habitat Restoration Programs at the Coalition to Restore Central Louisiana (CRCL), a nonprofit of environmentalists working to restore Louisiana's coastline. She supports wetland restoration projects and environmental justice movements.  

Given her environmental efforts and advocacy,  LaCour-Conant was featured in the #IfThen Exhibit in 2021–2022 which celebrates women innovators in STEM.

Background 
Kellyn LaCour-Conant grew up in Houston, Texas in a Catholic family. LaCour-Conant identifies as Two-Spirit and Afro-Indigenous, despite acknowledging that she is not an enrolled member of any federal tribe. LaCour-Conant is pansexual, uses she/they pronouns, identifies as mixed race, and began identifying as "two-spirit" as an adult. Hunting and fishing and learning about wildlife was part of her upbringing. Her family is from the Kisatchie Forest area in Louisiana and  LaCour-Conant is part of the Isle Brevelle Creole community. As a teen, she was part of the Student Conservation Association, where she was able to support environmental work in Texas and around the United States. 

She received a Bachelor's degree in Biology from Amherst College, and later a Master's degree in Marine and Environmental Biology from Nicholls State. Post-receiving her Masters, she worked for the Coastal Protection and Restoration Authority then pursued a non-profit where she focused on running community farms. LaCour-Conant is a Ph.D. student in Urban Forestry at Southern University.         

LaCour-Conant is a youth mentor with the AAAS If/Then program. Advocacy is part of her work including in 2020 being on the CBS television series Mission Unstoppable and taking part in the social media campaign #StaySafeForScience for the CDC Foundation and the Johns Hopkins Center to Health Security. In 2022 the Lyda Hill Philanthropies created an exhibition of 120 statues of contemporary women innovators in science, technology, engineering and math (STEM) and LaCour-Conant was in this exhibition.         

She is now serving as the director of Habitat Restoration Programs with the Coalition to Restore Central Louisiana (CRCL) where she runs Native Plant and Oyster Shell Recycling Programs.

LaCour-Conant describes her role of restoration ecologist as, "I work to heal the environment."

Coalition to Restore Central Louisiana (CRCL) 
In 2014 LaCour-Conant, as the director of the restoration program at CRCL, launched the first oyster-shell recycling program in Louisiana by partnering with 20 New Orleans restaurants to recycle shells and use them to restore coastal habitats. 

Using the recycled shells provided from their restaurant partners, the organization creates oyster reefs to protect wetlands from wave and shoreline erosion and to provide habitats to support plant and marine life. From 2014–2021, the program has been able to recycle over 70,000 sacks of shells, or 10 million pounds. This has built more than "7,000 feet of oyster reef living shoreline in Biloxi March, Barataria Bay, Pointe-au-Chien and Adam's Bay."

References 

Living people
Year of birth missing (living people)
21st-century American women scientists
Women ecologists
American ecologists
Amherst College alumni
Nicholls State University alumni
21st-century American scientists
Scientists from Texas
Louisiana Creole people
Pansexual women